Robert Crawford (4 February 1901 – 23 October 1965) was a Scottish professional footballer. A left half, he played in the Football League for Preston North End, Blackpool and Blackburn Rovers.

References

1901 births
1965 deaths
People from Glespin
Scottish footballers
Preston North End F.C. players
Blackpool F.C. players
Blackburn Rovers F.C. players
Southport F.C. players
Lancaster City F.C. players
Exeter City F.C. players
Barry Town United F.C. players
Association football wing halves
English Football League players
Glenbuck Cherrypickers F.C. players
Footballers from South Lanarkshire
Scottish Junior Football Association players